Agnes Hammarskjöld (née Almqvist; 1866–1940) was a Swedish woman who was the wife of Hjalmar Hammarskjöld, a Swedish nobleman and prime minister in the period 1914–1917.

Biography
Agnes Almqvist was born in 1866. She hailed from an established family, and her father was Fridolf Almqvist who served as the director general of the National Prisons Board. Carl Jonas Love Almqvist, an author, was her father's half-brother. Agnes had four brothers.

She married Hjalmar Hammarskjöld, and they lived in Vasa Castle. They had four sons: Bo, Åke, Sten and Dag. 

She was a religious person and intensively dealt with theology. She was one of the confidants of Lars Olof Jonathan Soderblom, the Lutheran bishop of Uppsala. She died in 1940 and was buried in the family grave in Uppsala.

In October 2011 a book about her entitled Agnes dag: en bild av Agnes Maria Carolina Almquist, gift Hammarskjöld was published by Lisa Segerhed.

References

Further reading
 

19th-century Swedish women
20th-century Swedish women
1866 births
1940 deaths
Spouses of prime ministers of Sweden
Swedish Lutherans

Agnes